David Martin (born May 12, 1961) is an American Republican politician from Michigan. He was elected to the Michigan House of Representatives from the 48th district in 2020, defeating incumbent representative Sheryl Kennedy. Prior to his role as state representative, Martin served on the Davison City Council.

Martin is the first GOP candidate to win the seat since the 1990s.

After redistricting, in 2022, Martin was elected to the 68th district.

References 

Living people
Michigan city council members
People from Davison, Michigan
21st-century American politicians
1961 births
Republican Party members of the Michigan House of Representatives